Lophanthera is a genus in the Malpighiaceae, a family of about 75 genera of flowering plants in the order Malpighiales. Lophanthera comprises 5 species of shrubs and trees, all but one native to the Amazonian South America; the exception (L. hammelii) is from Costa Rica. Lophanthera lactescens has become popular in recent decades as a cultivated ornamental in many warm regions of the Old and New World. It is propagated by cuttings and seeds.

External links
Malpighiaceae Malpighiaceae - description, taxonomy, phylogeny, and nomenclature
Lophanthera

Malpighiaceae
Malpighiaceae genera